The Gave de Pau is a river of south-western France. It takes its name from the city of Pau, through which it flows. From the Lago Helado on the slopes of Perdido water works through a cave system to emerge from the Resurgence Brulle via the Grotte Devaux on the French side of the border. The Gaves réunis is often considered to be part of the Gave de Pau.

Its main tributaries are the Béez, the Néez, the Ouzoum and the Ousse.

The Gave de Pau flows through the following départements and towns:

 Hautes-Pyrénées: Argelès-Gazost, Lourdes.
 Pyrénées-Atlantiques: Pau, Orthez.
 Landes: Peyrehorade.

References

Gave de Pau basin
Rivers of France
Rivers of Hautes-Pyrénées
Rivers of Pyrénées-Atlantiques
Rivers of Landes (department)
Rivers of Nouvelle-Aquitaine
Rivers of Occitania (administrative region)
Nouvelle-Aquitaine region articles needing translation from French Wikipedia